The 2017–18 Legia Warsaw season is the club's 101st season of existence, and their 81st in the top flight of Polish football. Legia entered the 2017–18 season as the defending Ekstraklasa champions.

Players

Current squad

Transfers

In

Out

Competitions

Friendlies

Polish Super Cup

Polish Cup

Legia Warsaw won 7–3 on aggregate.

Legia Warsaw won 3–2 on aggregate.

Ekstraklasa

Regular season

League table

Championship round

Matches

League table

Champions League

Second qualifying round

Legia Warsaw won 9–0 on aggregate.

Third qualifying round

Astana won 3–2 on aggregate.

Europa League

Play-off round

1–1 on aggregate. Sheriff Tiraspol won on away goals.

Statistics

Goalscorers

References

External links

Legia Warsaw seasons
Legia Warsaw